There are NASA facilities across the United States and around the world. NASA Headquarters in Washington, DC provides overall guidance and political leadership to the agency. There are 10 NASA field centers, which provide leadership for and execution of NASA's work. All other facilities fall under the leadership of at least one of these field centers. Some facilities serve more than one application for historic or administrative reasons. NASA has used or supported various observatories and telescopes, and an example of this is the NASA Infrared Telescope Facility.  In 2013 a NASA Office of the Inspector General's (OIG) Report recommended a Base Realignment and Closure Commission (BRAC) style organization to consolidate NASA's little used facilities. The OIG determined at least 33 of NASA's 155 facilities were underutilized.

List of field centers
NASA has ten field centers. Four of these were inherited from its predecessor, the National Advisory Committee for Aeronautics (NACA); two others were transferred to NASA from the United States Army; and NASA commissioned and built the other four itself shortly after its formation in 1958.

Inherited from NACA

Langley Research Center (LaRC), founded in 1917, is the oldest of NASA's field centers, located in Hampton, Virginia. LaRC focuses primarily on aeronautical research, though the Apollo lunar lander was flight-tested at the facility and a number of high-profile space missions have been planned and designed on-site. Established in 1917  by the National Advisory Committee for Aeronautics, the Center currently devotes two-thirds of its programs to aeronautics, and the rest to space. LaRC researchers use more than 40 wind tunnels to study improved aircraft and spacecraft safety, performance, and efficiency. Both Langley Field and the Langley Laboratory are named for aviation pioneer Samuel Pierpont Langley. Starting in 1958, when NASA started Project Mercury, LaRC housed the Space Task Group, which was expanded into the Manned Spacecraft Center and moved to Houston in 1961–1962. The selection of Houston as the location of the Manned Spacecraft Center resulted in some controversy at NASA Langley and in the surrounding area at the time, given they had previously expected either for Langley to be expanded or for a nearby location in the Hampton Roads region to be selected for the center.

Ames Research Center (ARC) at Moffett Field was founded on December 20, 1939. The center was named after Joseph Sweetman Ames, a founding member of the NACA. ARC is one of NASA's 10 major field centers and is located in California's Silicon Valley. Historically, Ames was founded to do wind-tunnel research on the aerodynamics of propeller-driven aircraft; however, it has expanded its role to doing research and technology in aeronautics, spaceflight, and information technology. It provides leadership in astrobiology, small satellites, robotic lunar exploration, intelligent/adaptive systems and thermal protection.

John H. Glenn Research Center (GRC), formerly the Lewis Flight Propulsion Laboratory, located in Brook Park, Ohio, was established in 1942 as a laboratory for aircraft engine research. In 1999, the center was officially renamed the NASA John H. Glenn Research Center at Lewis Field after John Glenn, an American fighter pilot, astronaut and politician. Glenn supports all of the agency's missions and major programs. Glenn excels in researching and developing innovative technologies for both aeronautics and space flight. A multitude of NASA missions have included elements from Glenn, from the Mercury and Gemini projects to the Space Shuttle Program and the International Space Station. The center's core competencies include air-breathing and in-space propulsion and cryogenics, communications, power energy storage and conversion, microgravity sciences, and advanced materials.

Armstrong Flight Research Center (AFRC), established by NACA before 1946 and located inside Edwards Air Force Base, is NASA's premier site for aeronautical research and operates some of the most advanced aircraft in the world. It is also the home of the Shuttle Carrier Aircraft (SCA), a modified Boeing 747 designed to carry a Space Shuttle orbiter back to Kennedy Space Center if one lands at Edwards. On January 16, 2014, the center previously known as Dryden was renamed in honor of Neil Armstrong, the first astronaut to walk on the Moon.

Transferred from the Army

The Jet Propulsion Laboratory (JPL), located in the San Gabriel Valley area of Los Angeles County, CA,  was, together with ABMA, one of the agencies behind Explorer 1, America's first robotic satellite, and also together with ABMA one of the first agencies to become a part of NASA. The facility is headquartered in the city of La Cañada Flintridge    with a Pasadena mailing  address. JPL is managed by the nearby California Institute of Technology (Caltech). The Laboratory's primary function is building and operating robotic planetary spacecraft, though it also conducts Earth-orbit and astronomy missions.  It is also responsible for operating NASA's Deep Space Network (DSN) which includes stations in Barstow, California; Madrid, Spain; and Canberra, Australia.

George C. Marshall Space Flight Center (MSFC), located on the Redstone Arsenal near Huntsville, Alabama, is one of NASA's largest centers. MSFC is where the Saturn V rocket and Spacelab were developed. Marshall is NASA's lead center for International Space Station (ISS) design and assembly; payloads and related crew training; and was the lead for Space Shuttle propulsion and its external tank. From December 1959, it contained the Launch Operations Directorate, which moved to Florida to become the Launch Operations Center on July 1, 1962.  The MSFC was named in honor of General George C. Marshall.  The center also operates the Michoud Assembly Facility (MAF) in New Orleans, Louisiana to build and assemble hardware components for space systems.

Built by NASA

Goddard Space Flight Center (GSFC), located in Greenbelt, Maryland, was commissioned by NASA on March 1, 1959. It is the largest combined organization of scientists and engineers in the United States dedicated to increasing knowledge of the Earth, the Solar System, and the Universe via observations from space. GSFC is a major U.S. laboratory for developing and operating unmanned scientific spacecraft. GSFC conducts scientific investigation, development and operation of space systems, and development of related technologies. Goddard scientists can develop and support a mission, and Goddard engineers and technicians can design and build the spacecraft for that mission. Goddard scientist John C. Mather shared the 2006 Nobel Prize in Physics for his work on COBE. GSFC also operates two spaceflight tracking and data acquisition networks (the Space Network and the Near Earth Network), develops and maintains advanced space and Earth science data information systems, and develops satellite systems for the National Oceanic and Atmospheric Administration (NOAA). External facilities of the GSFC include the Wallops Flight Facility at Wallops Island, Virginia, the Goddard Institute for Space Studies at Columbia University, and the Katherine Johnson Independent Verification and Validation Facility in West Virginia.

John C. Stennis Space Center, originally the Mississippi Test Facility, is located in Hancock County, Mississippi, on the banks of the Pearl River at the Mississippi–Louisiana border. Commissioned on October 25, 1961, it was NASA's largest rocket engine test facility until the end of the Space Shuttle program. It is currently used for rocket testing by over 30 local, state, national, international, private, and public companies and agencies. It also contains the NASA Shared Services Center.

Lyndon B. Johnson Space Center (JSC) is the National Aeronautics and Space Administration's center for human spaceflight training, research and flight control. Created as the Manned Spacecraft Center on November 1, 1961, the facility consists of a complex of 100 buildings constructed in 1962–1963 on 1,620 acres (656 ha) of land donated by Rice University in Houston, Texas. The center grew out of the Space Task Group formed soon after the creation of NASA to co-ordinate the US human spaceflight program.  It is home to the United States Astronaut Corps and is responsible for training astronauts from the U.S. and its international partners, and includes the Christopher C. Kraft Jr. Mission Control Center. The center was renamed in honor of the late U.S. president and Texas native Lyndon B. Johnson on February 19, 1973. JSC also operates the White Sands Test Facility in Las Cruces, New Mexico to support rocket testing.

John F. Kennedy Space Center (KSC), located west of Cape Canaveral Space Force Station in Florida, is one of the best known NASA facilities. Named the Launch Operations Center at its creation on July 1, 1962, it was renamed in honor of the late U.S. president on November 29, 1963, and has been the launch site for every United States human space flight since 1968. KSC continues to manage and operate uncrewed rocket launch facilities for America's civilian space program from three pads at Cape Canaveral. Its  Vehicle Assembly Building (VAB) is the eighth-largest structure in the world by volume and was the largest when completed in 1965. A total of 10,733 people worked at the center as of September 2021. Approximately 2,140 are employees of the federal government; the rest are contractors.

Other facilities

Canberra Deep Space Communication Complex (CDSCC) is a ground station that is located in Australia at Tidbinbilla outside Canberra. The complex is part of the Deep Space Network run by JPL. It is commonly referred to as the Tidbinbilla Deep Space Tracking Station and was officially opened on 19 March 1965. The station is separated from Canberra by the Coolamon Ridge, Urambi Hills and Bullen Range that help shield the city's radio frequency (RF) noise from the dishes.

Madrid Deep Space Communications Complex (MDSCC), in Spanish and officially Complejo de Comunicaciones de Espacio Profundo de Madrid, is a satellite ground station located in Robledo de Chavela, Spain, and operated by the Instituto Nacional de Técnica Aeroespacial (INTA) that is a part of the Deep Space Network of NASA's Jet Propulsion Laboratory (JPL)

In addition to JPL (above), there are other Government-Owned / Contractor-Operated NASA facilities operated under grant provisions, such as the Space Telescope Science Institute at Johns Hopkins University which operates the Hubble Space Telescope.

Organization
NASA headquarters, Washington, D.C.
Ames Research Center
Armstrong Flight Research Center
John H. Glenn Research Center at Lewis Field
Goddard Space Flight Center
Goddard Institute for Space Studies, New York, New York
Independent Verification and Validation Facility, Fairmont, West Virginia
Wallops Flight Facility, Wallops Island, Virginia
Jet Propulsion Laboratory
Deep Space Network stations:
Goldstone Deep Space Communications Complex, Barstow, California
Madrid Deep Space Communications Complex shared with INTA, Madrid, Spain
Canberra Deep Space Communications Complex, Canberra, Australian Capital Territory
Lyndon B. Johnson Space Center
White Sands Test Facility, Las Cruces, New Mexico
John F. Kennedy Space Center
Langley Research Center
George C. Marshall Space Flight Center
Michoud Assembly Facility, New Orleans, Louisiana
John C. Stennis Space Center

List of minor facilities

Communication and telescope facilities
 Deep Space Network (DSN) stations
 Canberra Deep Space Communication Complex, Canberra, Australia
 Goldstone Deep Space Communications Complex, Barstow, California
 Madrid Deep Space Communication Complex, Madrid, Spain
 NASA Infrared Telescope Facility, Hawaii
 Near Earth Network (NEN) Terminals
 Poker Flat Research Range, Fairbanks North Star Borough, Alaska
 Space Network (SN) Ground Terminals
 Guam Remote Ground Terminal, Guam

Manufacturing, test and research facilities
 Goddard Institute for Space Studies, New York City
 Independent Verification and Validation Facility, Fairmont, West Virginia
 Michoud Assembly Facility, New Orleans, Louisiana
 Plum Brook Station, Sandusky, Ohio (near Glenn Research Center)
 Wallops Flight Facility, Wallops Island, Virginia
 White Sands Complex, New Mexico
 White Sands Test Facility, Las Cruces, New Mexico

See also
 :Category:NASA facilities
 :Category:NASA groups, organizations, and centers
 List of NASA Visitor Centers
 Columbia Scientific Balloon Facility
 Crawlerway
 Lunar Sample Laboratory Facility
 National Transonic Facility
 Shuttle Landing Facility

References

 
NASA
Space technology research institutes